is a railway station located in the city of Tōkamachi, Niigata, Japan, operated by the third sector Hokuetsu Express.

Lines

Station layout

The platform level is closed unless a local train is scheduled to arrive because of the strong winds generated by high pressure difference between the tunnel and the ground level. Passengers alighting at this station cannot loiter. They must leave the platform level within 2 minutes or PA system with monitoring camera will ask the passengers to leave immediately. There are two automatic doors, one on the ground level and another at the platform level. The automatic door on the ground level is locked, preventing access to the platform level, until the train driver remotely unlocks the door. The two automatic doors never open at the same time, again, to avoid creating strong winds caused by pressure gradient. There is an underground waiting room between the two doors with wooden bench, timetable, and a suggestion box. Above ground, the waiting room features tatami and is air-conditioned.

Platforms

Adjacent stations

History
The station opened on March 22, 1997.

See also
 List of railway stations in Japan

References

External links

 Hokuetsu Express Station information 

Railway stations in Niigata Prefecture
Railway stations in Japan opened in 1997
Stations of Hokuetsu Express
Tōkamachi, Niigata